Kalavryta is a town and a municipality in the mountainous east-central part of the regional unit of Achaea, Greece. Notable mountains in the municipality are Mount Erymanthos in the west and Aroania or Chelmos in the southeast. Kalavryta is the southern terminus of the Diakopto-Kalavryta rack railway, built by Italian engineers between 1885 and 1895.

History
Kalavryta is built near the ancient city of Cynaetha.

During the late Middle Ages, the town was the centre of the Barony of Kalavryta within the Frankish Principality of Achaea, until it was reconquered by the Byzantines in the 1270s. After that it remained under Byzantine control until the fall of the Despotate of the Morea to the Ottoman Turks in 1460. With the exception of a 30-year interlude of Venetian control, the town remained under Turkish rule until the outbreak of the Greek War of Independence in 1821, in whose early stages Kalavryta figures prominently: it was here that on 21 March 1821 the flag of the revolt was raised at the monastery of Agia Lavra by bishop Germanos III of Old Patras.

At the end of 1943, near Kalavryta, 81 German soldiers, led by Hauptmann Johannes Schober, were captured by Greek partisans. Four Germans were killed on the spot. Three were taken to hospital at Kalavryta but were later shot by the furious partisans. The rest were initially treated as prisoners of war until most were shot dead and some plunged over the cliff near Mazi from the force of the shots. Two German prisoners survived the execution and raised the alarm on the following day 8 December 1943.

On 13 December 1943, in retribution for the killing of the captured German soldiers, German troops perpetrated the Kalavryta massacre: they ordered all male residents of Kalavryta aged 14 years or older to gather in a field just outside the village. Some 1,300 women and girls were locked in a school which was then set on fire while the men were looking on from a hill outside the village. Then 696 boys and men were machine-gunned; only 13 survived. After that, they burnt down the town before they left and the next day they burnt down the monastery of Agia Lavra, the birthplace of the Greek War of Independence. After the war, the federal government of Germany offered gestures of atonement in the form of free school books for the high school, scholarships for orphans of the massacre and the building of a retirement home. However, German commanders, including Major Ebersberger who carried out the destruction of Kalavryta and Hauptmann Dohnert who led the firing party, were never brought to justice for their crimes.

The Kalavryta region also became the site of fighting during the Greek Civil War. On 11 April 1948, Kalavryta was seized by the Democratic Army of Greece (DSE) after the former overpowered the town's garrison. DSE released 17 leftists held in the local gendarmerie building, while also emptying the national guard and United Nations Relief and Rehabilitation Administration warehouses; taking 400 million drachmas and large quantities of food and military equipment in the process.

Historical population

Landmarks 

In Kastria, in the municipal unit of Kleitoria, there is the famous cave system Spilaio ton Limnon ("Cave of the Lakes") which is filled with beautiful lakes and strange rock formations. Kalavryta has a ski centre which is located east of town, on the slopes of Chelmos.

Administration
The municipality Kalavryta was formed at the 2011 local government reform by the merger of the following 4 former municipalities, that became municipal units:
Aroania
Kalavryta
Kleitoria
Paion

The municipality has an area of 1,058.147 km2, the municipal unit 531.797 km2.

Subdivisions
The municipal unit of Kalavryta is divided into the following communities:
Ano Vlasia
Ano Lousoi
Doumena
Drosato
Flampoura (Flampoura, Neochori, Ortholithi)
Goumenissa
Kalavryta (Kalavryta, Avlonas, Vrachni, Krastikoi, Moni Agias Lavras, Souvardo)
Kallifoni
Kandalos
Kato Lousoi (Kato Lousoi, Lousiko)
Kato Vlasia (Kato Vlasia, Menychtaiika, Metochi)
Kato Zachlorou
Kerpini
Kertezi
Korfes
Kouteli
Kryoneri
Lagovouni
Lapanagoi
Manesi Kalavryton (Manesi, Boumpoukas)
Mikros Pontias (Mikros Pontias, Karousi, Lompokas, Megas Pontias)
Petsakoi (Petsakoi, Bosi)
Plataniotissa (Plataniotissa, Digela, Spartinou)
Priolithos
Profitis Ilias (Profitis Ilias, Mouriki)
Rogoi
Sigouni (Sigouni, Lefki)
Skepasto
Trechlo (Trechlo, Lapatheia)
Valta
Vilivina

Province
The province of Kalavryta was one of the provinces of Achaea. It had the same territory as the present municipality. It was abolished in 2006.

Notable people 
Asimakis Fotilas (1761–1835), politician and revolutionary leader
Nikolaos Petimezas, military leader
Anastasios Charalambis (1862–1949), military officer, PM of Greece
Andreas Zaimis

See also
List of settlements in Achaea
Chelmos-Vouraikos UNESCO Global Geopark

References

External links

Municipality of Kalavryta 
Museum of the Sacrificed People of Kalavryta

 
Municipalities of Western Greece
Populated places in Achaea
Provinces of Greece
Razed cities